Cardiovascular physiology is the study of the cardiovascular system, specifically addressing the physiology of the heart ("cardio") and blood vessels ("vascular").

These subjects are sometimes addressed separately, under the names cardiac physiology and circulatory physiology.

Although the different aspects of cardiovascular physiology are closely interrelated, the subject is still usually divided into several subtopics.

Heart

 Cardiac output (= heart rate * stroke volume. Can also be calculated with Fick principle, palpating method.)
 Stroke volume (= end-diastolic volume − end-systolic volume)
 Ejection fraction (= stroke volume / end-diastolic volume)
 Cardiac output is mathematically ` to systole
 Inotropic, chronotropic, and dromotropic states
 Cardiac input (= heart rate * suction volume Can be calculated by inverting terms in Fick principle)
 Suction volume (= end-systolic volume + end-diastolic volume)
 Injection fraction (=suction volume / end-systolic volume)
 Cardiac input is mathematically ` to diastole
 Electrical conduction system of the heart
 Electrocardiogram
 Cardiac marker
 Cardiac action potential
 Frank–Starling law of the heart
 Wiggers diagram
 Pressure volume diagram

Regulation of blood pressure
 Baroreceptor
 Baroreflex
 Renin–angiotensin system
 Renin
 Angiotensin
 Juxtaglomerular apparatus
 Aortic body and carotid body
 Autoregulation
 Cerebral Autoregulation

Hemodynamics

Under most circumstances, the body attempts to maintain a steady mean arterial pressure.

When there is a major and immediate decrease (such as that due to hemorrhage or standing up), the body can increase the following:
 Heart rate
 Total peripheral resistance (primarily due to vasoconstriction of arteries)
 Inotropic state

In turn, this can have a significant impact upon several other variables:
 Stroke volume
 Cardiac output
 Pressure
 Pulse pressure (systolic pressure - diastolic pressure)
 Mean arterial pressure (usually approximated with diastolic pressure + 1/3 pulse pressure)
 Central venous pressure

Regional circulation

See also
 Cardiovascular System Dynamics Society

References

External links
 
 Cardiovascular Physiology Concepts - Comprehensive explanation of basic cardiovascular concepts, based on a textbook of the same name.
 The Gross Physiology of the Cardiovascular System - Mechanical overview of cardiovascular function. Free eBook and video resources.
 Clinical Sciences - Cardiovascular An iPhone app covering detailed cardiovascular physiology and anatomy
  Quantitative Cardiovascular Physiology and Clinical Applications for Engineers

 
Cardiology
Circulatory system
Heart
Cardiac anatomy